In rail terminology, a through coach is a passenger car (coach) that is re-marshalled during the course of its journey.  It begins the journey attached to one train, and arrives at its destination attached to another train.

Through coaches save their transit passengers the need to change trains themselves.  They also increase the number of direct links offered by the train operator(s).

Most frequently in the form of sleeping or couchette cars, through coaches have commonly been used for long-distance journeys, especially in continental Europe, although they are much less common now than they were in the early 1970s.

Example 
In 2010 and 2011, the Basel – Moscow sleeping car ( in 37 hours and 11 minutes) was attached successively to the following trains:
 from Basel SBB to Hannover Hbf: CNL 472 Basel SBB – Copenhagen;
 from Hannover Hbf to Warszawa Wschodnia: EN 447 Amsterdam – Warszawa Wschodnia;
 from Brest to Moscow: D 22 Brest – Moscow.

See also

 Dividing train
Express train
Interchange (freight rail)
Slip coach
Section (rail transport)

References

This article is based upon a translation of the French language version as at February 2013.

Rail transport operations
Passenger railroad cars